David Humphreys (13 December 1936 – 2 May 2021) was an Australian cyclist. He competed in the individual road race at the 1964 Summer Olympics.

References

External links
 

1936 births
2021 deaths
Australian male cyclists
Olympic cyclists of Australia
Cyclists at the 1964 Summer Olympics
Place of birth missing